Okankolo Constituency is an electoral constituency in the Oshikoto Region of Namibia. It had 12,926 inhabitants in 2004 and 8,487 registered voters . The district capital is the settlement of Okankolo. Settlements in this constituency include Onkumbula, Omakango, Omunduta, Omhuuda, and Omutwewomedi.

Politics
Okankolo constituency is traditionally a stronghold of the South West Africa People's Organization (SWAPO) party. In the 2009 general election, incumbent President and SWAPO candidate Hifikepunye Pohamba received 96% of the votes for President. In the 2015 local and regional elections the SWAPO candidate won uncontested and became councillor after no opposition party nominated a candidate.

The SWAPO candidate also won the 2020 regional election. Hans Nambondi received 2,961 votes, well ahead of Wilhelm Thomas of the Independent Patriots for Change (IPC), an opposition party formed in August 2020, with 671 votes.

See also
 Administrative divisions of Namibia

References

Constituencies of Oshikoto Region
States and territories established in 1992
1992 establishments in Namibia